Eddie "Bongo" Brown (September 13, 1932 – December 28, 1984) was an American musician born in Clarksdale, Mississippi, and raised in Memphis, Tennessee. Brown played congas, bongos, the gourd and claves for Motown Records' in-house Funk Brothers band. One of his musical influences was Chano Pozo.

Motown recordings on which Brown played include "(I Know) I'm Losing You" by The Temptations, "I Second That Emotion" by Smokey Robinson & the Miracles, "What's Going On" by Marvin Gaye, and "If I Were Your Woman" by Gladys Knight & the Pips.

He died in Los Angeles, California in 1984, aged 52. He was survived by his wife, Geraldine Brown, and his children, Larry Cole, Larnetta Porter, Damita Brown-Haynie, Curtis Brown, and Edward Brown III.

Discography

As sideman
With The Brothers Johnson
 Blam! (A&M, 1978)
With Peabo Bryson and Natalie Cole
 We're the Best of Friends (Capitol Records, 1979)
With Clarence Carter
 Real (ABC, 1974)
With Randy Crawford
 Now We May Begin (Warner Bros. Records, 1980)
With Commodores
 Natural High (Motown, 1978)
 Heroes (Motown, 1980)
With Priscilla Coolidge
 Flying (Capricorn, 1979)
With The 5th Dimension
 High on Sunshine (Motown, 1979)
With Yvonne Fair
 The Bitch Is Black (Motown, 1975)
With Brass Fever
 Brass Fever (Impulse!, 1975) 
 Time Is Running Out (Impulse!, 1976)
With Marvin Gaye
 What's Going On (Motown Records, 1971)
 Let's Get It On (Motown Records, 1973)
 I Want You (Motown Records, 1976)
 Here, My Dear (Motown Records, 1978)
With Gloria Gaynor
 Stories (Polydor Records, 1980)
With Lesley Gore
 Love Me By Name (A&M, 1976)
With Kathe Green
 Kathe Green (Motown, 1976)
With John Handy
 Hard Work (Impulse, 1976)
 Carnival (Impulse, 1977)
With Thelma Houston
 Ready to Roll (Motown Records, 1978)
 Ride to the Rainbow (Motown Records, 1979)
With Thelma Houston and Jerry Butler
 Thelma & Jerry (Motown, 1977)
With Chuck Jackson
 I Wanna Give You Some Love (EMI, 1980)
With La Toya Jackson
 La Toya Jackson (Polydor, 1980)
With Al Johnson
 Back for More (Columbia, 1980)
With Gloria Jones
 Windstorm (Capitol Records, 1978)
With Margie Joseph
 Hear the Words, Feel the Feeling (Cotillon, 1976)
With Eddie Kendricks
 The Hit Man (Tamla, 1975)
With B.B. King
 King Size (ABC Records, 1977)
With Ben E. King
 Let Me Live in Your Life (Atlantic Records, 1978)
With Barbara Morrison
 Love Is a Four-Letter Word (Esoteric, 1984)
With Ray Parker Jr.
 Woman Out of Control (Arista Records, 1983)
With Wilson Pickett
 Don't Knock My Love (Atlantic Records, 1971)
With Billy Preston and Syreeta Wright
 Billy Preston & Syreeta (Motown Records, 1981)
With Helen Reddy
 Play Me Out (MCA Records, 1981)
With Martha Reeves
 Gotta Keep Moving (Fantasy Records, 1980)
With Rockie Robbins
 You and Me (A&M, 1980)
With Smokey Robinson
 Where There's Smoke... (Tamla, 1979)
With Kenny Rogers
 Share Your Love (Liberty Records, 1981)
With Patrice Rushen
 Posh (Elektra Records, 1980)
With Lara Saint Paul
 Saffo Music (Lasapa, 1977)
With Bob Seger
 Smokin' O.P.'s (Reprise Records, 1972)
 Back in '72 (Reprise Records, 1973)
With Marlena Shaw
 Sweet Beginnings (Columbia, 1977)
With Carly Simon
 Playing Possum (Elektra Records, 1975)
With Candi Staton
 Young Hearts Run Free (Warner Bros. Records, 1976)
 House of Love (Warner Bros. Records, 1978)
With Tavares
 Supercharged (Capitol, 1980)
With Leon Ware
 Musical Massage (Gordy, 1976)
 Leon Ware (Elektra, 1982)
With Deniece Williams
 When Love Comes Calling (Columbia Records, 1978)
With Stevie Wonder
 Songs in the Key of Life (Motown, 1976)
With Syreeta Wright
 One to One (Motown Records, 1977)
 The Spell (Tamla Records, 1983)
With Michael Wycoff
 On the Line (RCA, 1983)

References

External links

1932 births
1984 deaths
African-American drummers
American soul musicians
Musicians from Clarksdale, Mississippi
The Funk Brothers members
Conga players
American percussionists
Bongo players
American session musicians
20th-century American drummers
American male drummers
20th-century American male musicians
Brass Fever members
20th-century African-American musicians
R&B percussionists